Narellan was an electoral district of the Legislative Assembly in the Australian state of New South Wales between 1859 and 1880, which included the town of Narellan.

Members for Narellan

Election results

References

Former electoral districts of New South Wales
1859 establishments in Australia
1880 disestablishments in Australia
Constituencies established in 1859
Constituencies disestablished in 1880